Michael the Brave is a Romanian historic epic film, directed by Sergiu Nicolaescu and starring Amza Pellea in the leading role. The film is a representation of the life of Wallachia's ruler Michael The Brave, and his will to unite the three Romanian principalities (Wallachia, Moldavia and Transylvania) into one country. The film was released in 1970 in Romania, and worldwide by Columbia Pictures as The Last Crusade.

Plot
At the end of the 16th century, Wallachian ruler Prince Michael the Brave overcame the adversity of the Ottoman and Austrian Empires to unite Wallachia, Moldavia and Transylvania into one country.

Cast

Production
The film was produced in 1970 after a script by Titus Popovici. It starred Amza Pellea in the lead role, while the cast included a number of the best Romanian actors at the time, including Sergiu Nicolaescu, Ion Besoiu, Olga Tudorache, Florin Piersic, Ilarion Ciobanu, Silviu Stănculescu, and Mircea Albulescu.

The film had initially been intended to be an American-Romanian superproduction, with Columbia Pictures proposing actors such as Charlton Heston, Orson Welles, Laurence Harvey, Elizabeth Taylor, Richard Burton, or Kirk Douglas. But at Nicolae Ceauşescu's intent, the production was approved only with Romanian actors.

The story is historically less authentic, but is full of grand battle scenes, political plots, betrayals and family drama.  To reenact the battles that Mihai Viteazul fought against the Turks, some 5,000 soldiers of the Romanian army were brought to the set. Some reports put this number around 10,000 soldiers. The film has two parts and was shot in several locations, such as Istanbul, Prague and Călugăreni, but also the Danube, the Black Sea, Alba Iulia, Carpathian Mountains, Bucharest, Sibiu, Sinaia, and Miraslau.
The budget at the time was around 14 million lei, which in 2010 was estimated to be worth to be around 500,000 dollars, a relatively high sum for its period.

Release
The film was released in Romania in 1970 and ran in the cinemas for several years. Worldwide, it was distributed by Columbia Pictures, under the name The Last Crusade. The film debuted outside of Romania in July 1971 at the 7th Moscow International Film Festival and in East Germany, and in March 1972 in Finland, in June 1972 in West Germany and in April 1973 in Japan.

In 2000, the soundtrack of the film was redone in Dolby Surround. It is estimated that the film will be re-released in Blu-ray format sometime in 2010.

Reception
The film is the most viewed Romanian film worldwide. It was Romania's entry for an Academy Award for Best Foreign Language Film in 1972, but was not accepted as a nominee. At the Moscow International Film Festival in 1971, it won a Golden Award, but lost to Bilyy ptakh z chornoyu vidznakoyu (The White Bird Marked with Black). Nevertheless, it won at the Beaume Historic Film Festival in 1974, ahead of El Cid.

With a rating on 8.4 on Internet Movie Database, it is rated as the twentieth best historic film of all time. It is considered 18th in the biography category, 40th in the war category, 34th in the action category,. The director himself, Sergiu Nicolaescu, declared that he was impressed by the rating especially as it is an American website and the film was released four decades before.

See also
 List of submissions to the 44th Academy Awards for Best Foreign Language Film
 List of Romanian submissions for the Academy Award for Best Foreign Language Film

References

External links

http://wondersinthedark.wordpress.com/2009/06/12/mihai-viteazul-no-49/

Michael the Brave
1971 films
1970s historical films
1970s biographical films
Romanian biographical films
Romanian historical films
1970s Romanian-language films
Epic films based on actual events
Films set in the 16th century
Films set in Romania
Films directed by Sergiu Nicolaescu
Cultural depictions of Rudolf II, Holy Roman Emperor
Historical epic films